The Associated Press (AP), United Press International (UPI), Newspaper Enterprise Association (NEA), and New York Daily News selected All-Pro players following the 1966 NFL season.

Teams

References
 

All-Pro Teams
Allpro